Yield may refer to:

Measures of output/function

Computer science
 Yield (multithreading) is an action that occurs in a computer program during multithreading
 See generator (computer programming)

Physics/chemistry
 Yield (chemistry), the amount of product obtained in a chemical reaction
 The arrow symbol in a chemical equation
 Yield (engineering), yield strength of a material as defined in engineering and material science
 Fission product yield
 Nuclear weapon yield

Earth science
 Crop yield, measurement of the amount of a crop harvested, or animal products such as wool, meat or milk produced, per unit area of land
 Yield (wine), the amount of grapes or wine that is produced per unit surface of vineyard
 Ecological yield, the harvestable population growth of an ecosystem, most commonly measured in forestry and fishery
 Specific yield, a measure of aquifer capacity
 Yield (hydrology), the volume of water escaping from a spring

Production/manufacturing
 Yield (casting)
 Throughput yield, a manufacturing evaluation method
 A measure of functioning devices in semiconductor testing, see Semiconductor device fabrication#Device test
 The number of servings provided by a recipe and hulk

Finance
 Yield (finance), a rate of return for a security
 Dividend yield and earnings yield, measures of dividends paid on stock

Other uses
 Yield (college admissions), a statistic describing what percent of applicants choose to enroll
 Yield (album), by Pearl Jam
 Yield sign, a traffic sign
 The Yield, a 2019 novel by Tara June Winch
 Yield, a feature of a coroutine in computer programming
 Yield, an element of the TV series The Amazing Race